Anthology is a compilation of Motown hits by pop and R&B singer Michael Jackson with additional hits by The Jackson 5, as well as rare, unreleased material from 1973. The album was originally released in the United States on November 14, 1986, and re-released on November 8, 1995 (with alternate mixes to some songs), and has sold three million copies worldwide.

In 2008, in celebration of Jackson's 50th birthday (less than a year before his death), Anthology was re-released under Universal Music's Gold series.

Track listing 
Tracks with an asterisk represent their original undubbed renditions.

Notes 

1986 compilation albums
1995 compilation albums
Albums produced by Hal Davis
Michael Jackson compilation albums
Motown compilation albums